Jaucourt is the name of:

Jaucourt, Aube, a municipality in the Aube département in France 
Arnail François, Marquis de Jaucourt, French politician
Louis de Jaucourt, French physicist and writer, a major contributor to Diderot's Encyclopédie